Grégory Pastel (born 20 January 1991 in Fort-de-France, Martinique) is a professional footballer who plays as a forward for RC Rivière-Pilote and internationally for Martinique.

Pastel spent 3 years with AS Nancy and a year at FC Mulhouse before signing for US Ivry in January 2013. On leaving US Ivry, he returned to Martinique, rejoining RC Rivière-Pilote.

He made his debut for Martinique in 2014. He was in the Martinique Gold Cup squad for the 2017 tournament.

References

1990s births
Living people
Martiniquais footballers
French footballers
Martinique international footballers
Association football forwards
2019 CONCACAF Gold Cup players
2021 CONCACAF Gold Cup players